DocumentCloud is an open-source software as a service platform that allows users to upload, analyze, annotate, collaborate on and publish primary source documents. Since its launch in 2009, it has been used primarily by journalists to find information in the documents they gather in the course of their reporting and, in the interests of transparency, publish the documents. As of August 2015, DocumentCloud users had uploaded more than 2 million documents containing 27 million pages. Many of them are accessible via a public search portal.

DocumentCloud’s development has led to the creation of several notable open-source projects, including Backbone.js, Jammit and Underscore.js. The majority of funding for DocumentCloud has come from grants by the Knight Foundation.

History 

In 2009, journalists Scott Klein and Eric Umansky of ProPublica and Aron Pilhofer of The New York Times received a Knight News Challenge grant for initial development of the platform. Jeremy Ashkenas joined as lead developer, and DocumentCloud was incorporated as a nonprofit organization. By September 2009, two dozen media outlets including The Washington Post, The New York Times and the Chicago Tribune had signed on as beta testers.

A public beta was announced at the 2010 NICAR conference of Investigative Reporters and Editors, and within a year contributing news organizations had uploaded 1 million pages.

In 2011, DocumentCloud received a second Knight News Challenge grant, dissolved its own nonprofit entity, and merged with the nonprofit Investigative Reporters and Editors. Since then, IRE has assumed primary responsibility for maintenance and development of the platform as well as managing its grant funding.

DocumentCloud received a third Knight grant in summer 2014, with primary goals including improved platform stability, new features, and developing a plan for financial sustainability.  Since its start, DocumentCloud accounts have been free to journalism organizations, but the organization has announced it will be implementing a pay model.

On June 11, 2018, DocumentCloud and MuckRock announced they would be merging.

Open-source projects

In addition to the platform itself, development of DocumentCloud has led to the creation of several open-source projects:

 Backbone.js
 Underscore.js
 Jammit
 PDFShaver
 CloudCrowd
 Docsplit

References

Sources
 DocumentCloud's potential outside of Journalism ProfHacker blog in The Chronicle of Higher Education
 Sunlight Foundation Introduction to DocumentCloud
 Interview with DocumentCloud co-founder Aron Pilhofer by the Online Journalism Review
 Neiman Lab's encyclopedia entry for DocumentCloud

External links
 
 

Cloud storage
JavaScript libraries
Internet properties established in 2009
File sharing communities